George Longmore Paterson (19 December 1916 – June 1996) was a Scottish footballer who played as a defender.

External links
 LFC History profile
 Swindon Town appearances

1916 births
1996 deaths
Scottish footballers
Liverpool F.C. players
Swindon Town F.C. players
English Football League players
Footballers from Aberdeen
Association football inside forwards
Brighton & Hove Albion F.C. players
York City F.C. players
Leeds United F.C. players
Queens Park Rangers F.C. players
Reading F.C. players
Burnley F.C. wartime guest players